French of France is the predominant variety of the French language in France, Andorra and Monaco, in its formal and informal registers. It has, for a long time, been associated with Standard French. It is now seen as a variety of French alongside Acadian French, Belgian French, Quebec French, Swiss French, etc. In overseas France or Corsica, it is more often called Metropolitan French or Hexagonal French.

Phonology

Paris 
In Paris, nasal vowels are no longer pronounced as in traditional Parisian French:  → ,  → ,  →  and  → .

Southern provinces 

In the south of France, nasal vowels have not changed and are still pronounced as in traditional Parisian French: enfant , pain , bon  and brun . Many distinctions are lost. At the end of words, most speakers still distinguish  and : both livré and livret are pronounced . Older speakers pronounce all es: chaque  and vêtement .

Northern provinces 

Lorraine 
Phonemic long vowels are still maintained: pâte  and fête . Before ,  changes to : guitare is pronounced  and voir .

See also 
 Languages of France

References 

French language
Languages of France